Edward William Shore (November 23, 1902 – March 16, 1985) was a Canadian professional ice hockey defenceman, principally for the Boston Bruins of the National Hockey League, and the longtime owner of the Springfield Indians of the American Hockey League, iconic for his toughness and defensive skill. In 2017, Shore was named one of the '100 Greatest NHL Players' in history.

Shore won the Hart Trophy as the NHL's most valuable player four times, the most of any defenceman; only Wayne Gretzky and Gordie Howe have won it more often. After the league began naming NHL All-Star teams at the end of Shore's fifth season, Shore was honoured as a First Team All-Star in seven of his last nine seasons, while being named a Second Team All-Star one of the other seasons; in the remaining season he missed over half the schedule due to injury. A bruiser known for his violence, Shore set a then-NHL record for 165 penalty minutes in his second season.

Playing career

Shore started his career with his hometown minor hockey team in Cupar, Saskatchewan, the Cupar Canucks. He played for the Melville Millionaires and won the 1923-24 Saskatchewan senior championship.

Shore moved up to professional hockey with the Regina Capitals of the Western Canada Hockey League in 1925. His team finished last in the league and moved to Portland after the season. Shore moved to the league champion Edmonton Eskimos in 1926, where he converted from forward to defence and was given the nickname "the Edmonton Express".

When the Western Hockey League (renamed from the WCHL) folded in 1926, Shore was sold to the Boston Bruins of the NHL. As a rookie, he scored 12 goals and six assists for a total of 18 points and accumulated 130 penalty minutes. His first goal came on November 20, 1926 in Boston's 5-1 loss to Chicago.  Shore helped the Bruins win their first Stanley Cup in 1929.

In the 1925–26 season, Billy Coutu and Sprague Cleghorn of the Montreal Canadiens were traded to the Boston Bruins. During their first practice with the Bruins, Shore strutted back and forth in front of Coutu and Cleghorn. Coutu body-slammed, head-butted, elbowed and tried to torment Shore. Next Coutu picked up the puck and made a rush at Shore. The two players collided. Shore held his ground and Coutu flew through the air violently crashing to the ice. Shore's ear was almost ripped off but he barely noticed it. Coutu was out cold and was out of commission for a week. Shore visited several doctors who wanted to amputate the ear, but found one who sewed it back on. After refusing anesthetic, Shore used a mirror to watch the doctor sew the ear on. Shore claimed Coutu used his hockey stick to cut off the ear, and Coutu was fined $50. Shore later recanted and Coutu's money was refunded.

Another unusual incident involving Shore occurred in January 1930 when he was challenged to a boxing match by baseball player Art Shires. While NHL President Frank Calder said that Shore's participation was up to Bruins' manager Art Ross to decide, baseball commissioner Judge Kenesaw Mountain Landis vetoed Shires' participation, and the match was never held. On January 24, 1933, during a game against Montreal, Shore accidentally punched NHL referee-in-chief Cooper Smeaton during a fight with Sylvio Mantha and was fined $100.

On March 30, 1933, Shore scored a playoff overtime goal against Toronto, the only time he accomplished that feat in his career.

In Boston Garden on December 12, 1933, Shore ended the career of Toronto Maple Leafs star Ace Bailey when he hit Bailey from behind. When Bailey's head hit the ice, he was knocked unconscious and went into convulsions. Moments earlier, Maple Leafs teammate King Clancy upended Shore with a hard check as he rushed up the ice. Angry, dazed, and thinking he was going after Clancy, Shore rushed at Bailey intent on revenge. In retaliation, the Leafs tough-guy Red Horner punched Shore, whose head hit the ice as he fell from the blow. Shore was knocked unconscious and required seven stitches but was not seriously injured. Bailey was rushed to hospital in critical condition with a fractured skull and was operated on for more than four hours. There were many fears that he could possibly die. He came out of a coma for the second time 10 days later, making a full recovery, but he did not play professionally again. When he was assured that Bailey would survive, league president Frank Calder suspended Shore for 16 games. An all-star benefit game was held at Maple Leaf Gardens on February 14, 1934, which raised $20,909 for Bailey and his family. Bailey and Shore shook hands and embraced at centre ice before the game began. Thirteen years later, the NHL introduced an annual all-star game.

Shore and the Bruins won their second Stanley Cup in 1939. Shore retired and bought the Springfield Indians of the American Hockey League, where he was player-owner in 1939–40. He was persuaded to rejoin the Bruins after injuries to the Bruins' defence corps, with an agreement that he would play in home games for $200 per match. Shore played just four games for Boston, and was reported as being unenthusiastic about the arrangement. Obtaining permission to play in the Indians' home games, he began to agitate to play in Springfield road games as well, which provoked his trade to the New York Americans on January 25, 1940, for Eddie Wiseman and $5000. He stayed with the Americans through their elimination from the playoffs, and was simultaneously playing with the Indians in their playoff games. Shore's final NHL game was March 24 against the Detroit Red Wings, which coincidentally was also the final NHL game for Hall of Famer and teammate Nels Stewart.

In February 1940, Shore and eight other arena managers organized the Ice Capades.

Retirement and the Indians

Although Shore had played his last NHL game, he played two more seasons in Springfield. The Indians halted operations during World War II, and Shore moved his players to Buffalo where he coached the Buffalo Bisons of the AHL to the Calder Cup championship in 1943 and 1944. After the war, the Springfield Indians resumed play in 1946 and Shore returned.

In addition to owning the Indians, Shore purchased the Oakland Oaks of the Pacific Coast Hockey League (PCHL) in May 1948, and owned the team until it folded in December 1949.

As an owner, Shore could be cantankerous and was often accused of treating players with little respect. He commonly had Springfield players who had been out of the lineup perform maintenance in the Eastern States Coliseum, the Indians' home, referring to them as "Black Aces". Today, the term is commonly used to refer to extra players on the roster who train with the team in case of injury.  Despite this, the Indians prospered under his ownership, making the playoffs 12 times and winning three Calder Cups in a row from 1960 to 1962. During the 1967 season, the entire Indians team refused to play after Shore suspended three players without pay, including future NHL star Bill White, for what he said was "indifferent play". When the team asked for an explanation, Shore suspended the two players who spoke for the team, one of whom was Brian Kilrea. Alan Eagleson, then a little-known lawyer and sometime politician, was brought in to negotiate with Shore on the players' behalf. The battle escalated for months, ending with Shore giving up day-to-day operation of the club to the Los Angeles Kings; the genesis of the National Hockey League Players' Association stems from that incident. Shore took back full control of the team in 1974, changed its name back to the Indians and restored its traditional blue-white-red scheme. He continued to own the team until he sold it in 1976.

For his contributions to the game of hockey, Eddie Shore was awarded the vanity license plate "MR HOCKEY" by the Commonwealth of Massachusetts.

On March 15, 1985, Shore was visiting his son in Springfield, Massachusetts. That night, Shore began coughing up and vomiting blood and was later rushed to the hospital. He was pronounced dead the next morning and the cause of death was later determined to be liver cancer. His funeral was held in his hometown five days later. He is buried in Hillcrest Park Cemetery in the Sixteen Acres section of Springfield.

Shore was elected to the Hockey Hall of Fame in 1947. The Boston Bruins retired his uniform number, 2. The Eddie Shore Award is given annually to the AHL's best defenceman. In 1998, he was ranked number 10 on The Hockey News list of the 100 Greatest Hockey Players, making him the highest-ranked pre-World War II player.

Cultural references
In the film Slap Shot, Eddie Shore's name, along with Toe Blake and Dit Clapper, is considered synonymous with "old-time hockey." Shore is also featured in the Don Cherry biopic Keep Your Head Up Kid: The Don Cherry Story where he was portrayed by Stephen McHattie.

 Awards, honours and records 
Named to the WHL first All-Star team in 1926.
Stanley Cup winner in 1929 and 1939.
Named to the NHL first All-Star team in 1931, 1932, 1933, 1935, 1936, 1938, 1939.
 Won the Hart Memorial Trophy as the NHL's Most Valuable Player in 1933, 1935, 1936, 1938.
 Named to the NHL second All-Star team in 1934.
 His #2' Jersey was retired by the Boston Bruins in 1947.
 Inducted into the Hockey Hall of Fame in 1947.
 Won the Lester B. Patrick Award for contributions to hockey in 1970.
 Inducted into Canada's Sports Hall of Fame in 1975.
 In 1998, he was ranked #10 on ''The Hockey News''' list of the 100 Greatest Hockey Players.
 In January, 2017, Shore was part of the first group of players to be named one of the '100 Greatest NHL Players' in history.

Records 

 NHL Record for most Hart Memorial Trophies as the NHL's Most Valuable Player by a Defenceman: (4)

Career statistics

* Stanley Cup Champion.

References

External links

AHL Hall of Fame biography

1902 births
1985 deaths
Boston Bruins players
Canadian ice hockey defencemen
Deaths from cancer in Massachusetts
Deaths from liver cancer
Edmonton Eskimos (ice hockey) players
Hart Memorial Trophy winners
Hockey Hall of Fame inductees
Ice hockey people from Saskatchewan
Lester Patrick Trophy recipients
National Hockey League All-Stars
National Hockey League players with retired numbers
New York Americans players
People from Fort Qu'Appelle
Regina Capitals players
Springfield Indians
Stanley Cup champions